Thomas Appleby (c. 1488 – 1563) was Informator Choristarum at Magdalen College, Oxford from 1539 until 1541, where he was succeeded by John Sheppard. Appleby was also the organist and instructor of the choristers at Lincoln Cathedral from 1538 to 1539 and from 1541 to 1562.

Sources

1480s births
1563 deaths
Year of birth uncertain
English classical composers
Renaissance composers
English classical organists
British male organists
Cathedral organists
15th-century English people
16th-century English composers
English male classical composers
Male classical organists